Skrzynki  is a village in the administrative district of Gmina Ujazd, Tomaszów Mazowiecki County, Łódź Voivodeship, Poland.

The village has a population of 510.

References

Villages in Tomaszów Mazowiecki County